The 2019 Women's EuroHockey Junior Championship II was the 11th edition of the Women's EuroHockey Junior Championship II, the second level of the women's European under-21 field hockey championships organized by the European Hockey Federation. It was held from 14 to 20 July 2019 in Alanya, Turkey.

Scotland won their second EuroHockey Junior Championship II title and were promoted to the 2022 Women's EuroHockey Junior Championship together with  Wales.

Qualified teams
The participating teams have qualified based on their final ranking from the 2017 competition.

Results

Preliminary round

Pool A

Pool B

Fifth to eighth place classification

Pool C
The points obtained in the preliminary round against the other team are taken over.

First to fourth place classification

Semi-finals

Third place game

Final

Statistics

Final standings

See also
2019 Men's EuroHockey Junior Championship II
2019 Women's EuroHockey Championship II
2019 Women's EuroHockey Junior Championship

References

Women's EuroHockey Junior Championship II
Junior 2
International women's field hockey competitions hosted by Turkey
Alanya
EuroHockey Junior Championship II
EuroHockey Junior Championship II
EuroHockey Junior Championship II